The Austric languages are a proposed language family that includes the Austronesian languages spoken in Taiwan, Maritime Southeast Asia, the Pacific Islands, and Madagascar, as well as the Austroasiatic languages spoken in Mainland Southeast Asia and South Asia. A genetic relationship between these language families is seen as plausible by some scholars, but remains unproven.

Additionally, the Kra–Dai languages and Hmong–Mien languages are included by some linguists, and even Japanese was speculated to be Austric in an early version of the hypothesis.

History
The Austric macrofamily was first proposed by the German missionary Wilhelm Schmidt in 1906. He showed phonological, morphological, and lexical evidence to support the existence of an Austric phylum consisting of Austroasiatic and Austronesian. Schmidt's proposal had a mixed reception among scholars of Southeast Asian languages, and received only little scholarly attention in the following decades.

Research interest into Austric resurged in the late 20th century, culminating in a series of articles by La Vaughn H. Hayes who presented a corpus of Proto-Austric vocabulary together with a reconstruction of Proto-Austric phonology, and by Lawrence Reid, focussing on morphological evidence.

Evidence 
Reid (2005) lists the following pairs as "probable" cognates between Proto-Austroasiatic and Proto-Austronesian.

Among the morphological evidence, he compares reconstructed affixes such as the following, and notes that shared infixes are less likely to be borrowed (for a further discussion of infixes in Southeast Asian languages, see also Barlow 2022).
 prefix *pa- 'causative' (Proto-Austroasiatic, Proto-Austronesian)
 infix *-um- 'agentive' (Proto-Austroasiatic, Proto-Austronesian)
 infix *-in- 'instrumental' (Proto-Austroasiatic), 'nominalizer' (Proto-Austronesian)

Below are 10 selected Austric lexical comparisons by Diffloth (1994), as cited in Sidwell & Reid (2021):

Extended proposals 
The first extension to Austric was first proposed Wilhelm Schmidt himself, who speculated about including Japanese within Austric, mainly because of assumed similarities between Japanese and the Austronesian languages. While the proposal about a link between Austronesian and Japanese still enjoys some following as a separate hypothesis, the inclusion of Japanese was not adopted by later proponents of Austric.

In 1942, Paul K. Benedict provisionally accepted the Austric hypothesis and extended it to include the Kra–Dai (Thai–Kadai) languages as an immediate sister branch to Austronesian, and further speculated on the possibility to include the Hmong–Mien (Miao–Yao) languages as well. However, he later abandoned the Austric proposal in favor of an extended version of the Austro-Tai hypothesis.

Sergei Starostin adopted Benedict's extended 1942 version of Austric (i.e. including Kra–Dai and Hmong–Mien) within the framework of his larger Dené–Daic proposal, with Austric as a coordinate branch to Dené–Caucasian, as shown in the tree below.

Another long-range proposal for wider connections of Austric was brought forward by John Bengtson, who grouped Nihali and Ainu together with Austroasiatic, Austronesian, Hmong–Mien, and Kra–Dai in a "Greater Austric" family.

Reception 

In the second half of the last century, Paul K. Benedict raised a vocal critique of the Austric proposal, eventually calling it an 'extinct' proto-language.

Hayes' lexical comparisons, which were presented as supporting evidence for Austric between 1992 and 2001, were criticized for the greater part as methodologically unsound by several reviewers. Robert Blust, a leading scholar in the field of Austronesian comparative linguistics, pointed out "the radical disjunction of morphological and lexical evidence" which characterizes the Austric proposal; while he accepts the morphological correspondences between Austronesian and Austroasiatic as possible evidence for a remote genetic relationship, he considers the lexical evidence unconvincing.

A 2015 analysis using the Automated Similarity Judgment Program (ASJP) did not support the Austric hypothesis. In this analysis, the supposed "core" components of Austric were assigned to two separate, unrelated clades: Austro-Tai and Austroasiatic-Japonic. Note however that ASJP is not widely accepted among historical linguists as an adequate method to establish or evaluate relationships between language families.

Distributions

See also
 East Asian languages
 Austro-Tai languages
 Sino-Austronesian languages
 Mainland Southeast Asia linguistic area
 Classification of Southeast Asian languages

Notes

References

Works cited 

 
 
 
 
 
 
 
 
 
 
 
 
 
 
 
 
 
 
 
 
 .

Further reading

 Blazhek, Vaclav. 2000. Comments on Hayes "The Austric Denti-alveolar Sibilants". Mother Tongue V:15-17.
 Blust, Robert. 1996. Beyond the Austronesian homeland: The Austric hypothesis and its implications for archaeology. In: Prehistoric Settlement of the Pacific, ed. by Ward H.Goodenough,  DIANE Publishing Co, Collingdale PA, 1996, pp. 117–137. (Transactions of the American Philosophical Society 86.5. (Philadelphia: American Philosophical Society).
 Blust, Robert. 2000. Comments on Hayes, "The Austric Denti-alveolar Sibilants". Mother Tongue V:19-21.
 Fleming, Hal. 2000. LaVaughn Hayes and Robert Blust Discuss Austric. Mother Tongue V:29-32.
 Hayes, La Vaughn H. 2000. Response to Blazhek's Comments. Mother Tongue V:33-4.
 Hayes, La Vaughn H. 2000. Response to Blust's Comments. Mother Tongue V:35-7.
 Hayes, La Vaughn H. 2000. Response to Fleming's Comments. Mother Tongue V:39-40.
 Hayes, La Vaughn H. 2001. Response to Sidwell. Mother Tongue VI:123-7.
Larish, Michael D. 2006. Possible Proto-Asian Archaic Residue and the Statigraphy of Diffusional Cumulation in Austro-Asian Languages. Paper presented at the Tenth International Conference on Austronesian Linguistics, 17–20 January 2006, Puerto Princesa City, Palawan, Philippines.
 Reid, Lawrence A. 1996. The current state of linguistic research on the relatedness of the language families of East and Southeast Asia. In: Ian C. Glover and Peter Bellwood, editorial co-ordinators, Indo-Pacific Prehistory: The Chiang Mai Papers, Volume 2, pp . 87-91. Bulletin of the Indo-Pacific Prehistory Association 15. Canberra: Australian National University.
 Sidwell, Paul. 2001. Comments on La Vaughn H. Hayes' "On the Origin of Affricates in Austric". Mother Tongue VI:119-121.
 Van Driem, George. 2000. Four Austric Theories. Mother Tongue V:23-27.

External links
 Glossary of purported lexical links among Austronesian and Austroasiatic languages
 Austronesian Basic Vocabulary Database: Austronesian, Tai–Kadai, Hmong–Mien, Austro-Asiatic word lists

 
Proposed language families